Order of Leopold may refer to:

 Order of Leopold (Austria), founded in 1808 by emperor Francis I of Austria and discontinued in 1918
 Order of Leopold (Belgium), founded in 1832 by king Leopold I of Belgium
 Order of Leopold II, founded in Congo Free State in 1900 as "Order of Leopold" and incorporated into the Belgian honor system in 1908, by Leopold II of Belgium
 Order of Leopold (Lippe), founded in 1906 by Leopold IV, Prince of Lippe.